NPO 3 (NPO drie, formerly Nederland 3  until 2014) is the third and youngest of the terrestrial television channels operated by the Dutch public-broadcasting organization NPO in the Netherlands.

History
Initially the third Dutch public television channel would be a joint venture with the Flemish public broadcaster VRT (then called BRTN), which would specialize in a cooperative Netherlands/Flanders programming. With the pretended cooperation, BRT (now VRT) would either continue or terminate its second channel by operating it more lucratively. This plan failed but later resulted in a new television channel targeting Dutch and Flemish people living abroad. Two Dutch broadcasters, NPO and RNW, launched BVN as Zomer TV in 1996, and all of its programming originally came from the Netherlands (the abbreviation BVN at first standing for het Beste Van Nederland, "the best of the Netherlands"), this however changed, once the VRT began contributing both financially and delivering programmes, changing the channel from specializing in programming from the Netherlands to specializing in Dutch programming from the Netherlands and Flanders.

NPO 3 was established as 'Nederland 3' on 4 April 1988, however the channel was used for experimental purposes for the Winter Olympic Games in Calgary earlier on in the year. Nederland 3 became the home channel of the broadcasters VPRO, VARA, RVU, and NPS, all of which share a progressive outlook. The initial emphasis was news, culture and sports.

In September 2000, AVRO, BNN, EO, KRO and TROS later joined this channel in producing more content for its programming output. The channel focused on news, debate, culture and innovative television. Before the evening the channel's programming, under the label of Z@ppelin, was aimed at children.

In September 2006, the programming of NPO's television channels changed slightly. Nederland 3 still focuses on children during the daytime. In the evenings it aims to reach an open-minded audience with innovative, educational television and occasionally sports. All Dutch public broadcasting organizations have air-time on Nederland 1, Nederland 2 and Nederland 3; youth-oriented broadcaster BNN broadcast only on Nederland 3.

On 15 September 2007, the NPO channels Nederland 1, Nederland 2 and Nederland 3 switched completely to anamorphic widescreen, before that time some of the programming was already broadcast in widescreen.

On 4 July 2009, all three channels began simulcasting in 1080i high-definition. Before the launch of the permanent HD service, a test version of the Nederland 1 HD channel was made available from 2 June 2008 until 24 August 2008 in order to broadcast Euro 2008, the 2008 Tour de France, and the 2008 Summer Olympics in HD.

On 12 March 2013, the NPO announced that Nederland 1, 2 and 3 will be renamed as NPO 1, 2 and 3. The reason for this change is to make the channels and its programmes more recognizable. The rebranding completed on 19 August 2014.

Programming
Between 06:00 and 19:30, NPO Zapp and NPO Zappelin broadcast television oriented at children. This includes educational television like SchoolTV from broadcaster NTR.

After 19:30, the programming for youth and young adults starts. Between 2005 and 2013, De Wereld Draait Door was broadcast at this time, but moved to NPO 1. The programming is filled with films, drama and comedy (both made by the public broadcasters and imported from foreign broadcasters), as well as successful programmes such as Top of the Pops, College Tour, De Lama's, Spuiten en Slikken and Raymann is Laat. It also broadcasts European football competitions live such as the UEFA Champions League until the 2015–16 season, when it was moved to SBS 6.

Logos and identities

See also
Television networks in the Netherlands

References

External links
 NPO 3 website 

Television channels in the Netherlands
Television channels and stations established in 1988
Netherlands Public Broadcasting
Mass media in Hilversum